Batocera humeridens is a species of flat-faced longhorn beetle in the subfamily Lamiinae of the family Cerambycidae.

Description
Batocera humeridens is a large flat-faced longhorn beetle reaching  of length. The basic colour of the body is dark greyish with clearer greyish dorsal irregular spots on the elytra usually four on each elytron. Pronotum show two red depressions on both sides of the median line.

Distribution
This species can be found in Timor, Flores and in some other islands south of Sulawesi (Moa and Allor Islands).

References
  Biolib
 Lamiaires du monde

External links
 Search life forms
 Asian Cerambycidae

Batocerini
Beetles described in 1859